Julie Vignola  is a Canadian politician, who was elected to the House of Commons of Canada in the 2019 election. She represents Beauport—Limoilou as a member of the Bloc Québécois.

The result was a surprise for Vignola, who "never anticipated such a result when she became a candidate".

Electoral record

References

External links 

 
 openparliament/

Bloc Québécois MPs
Women members of the House of Commons of Canada
Members of the House of Commons of Canada from Quebec
People from Sept-Îles, Quebec
Politicians from Quebec City
21st-century Canadian politicians
21st-century Canadian women politicians
Canadian schoolteachers
Year of birth missing (living people)
Living people